German submarine U-159 was a Type IXC U-boat of Nazi Germany's Kriegsmarine built for service during World War II. The keel for this boat was laid down on 11 November 1940 at the DeSchiMAG AG Weser yard in Bremen, Germany as yard number 1009. She was launched on 1 July 1941 and commissioned on 4 October under the command of Kapitänleutnant Helmut Witte (Knight's Cross).

The U-boat's service began with training as part of the 4th U-boat Flotilla. She then moved to the 10th flotilla on 1 May 1942 for operations. She sank 23 ships, totalling  and damaged one more of 265 GRT.

She was sunk by an American aircraft on 28 July 1943.

Design
German Type IXC submarines were slightly larger than the original Type IXBs. U-159 had a displacement of  when at the surface and  while submerged. She had two shafts and two  propellers.

U-159 was fitted with six  torpedo tubes (four fitted at the bow and two at the stern), 22 torpedoes, one  SK C/32 naval gun, 180 rounds, and a  SK C/30 as well as a  C/30 anti-aircraft gun. The boat had a complement of forty-eight.

Service history

First and second patrols
The submarine's first patrol took her from Kiel on 22 April 1942, across the North Sea and into the Atlantic Ocean through the gap between the Faroe and Shetland Islands. She arrived at Lorient, in occupied France, on 3 May. She would be based at this Atlantic port for the rest of her career.

She also attacked Illinois, which with a cargo of 8,000 tons of manganese ore, sank in 40 seconds. The U-boat's deck gun got plenty of use, sinking Sally on 5 June and Flora on the 18th. On another occasion, due to rough seas, the weapon could not be used in the attack on the Brazilian sailing ship Paracury; her 20mm AA gun was used instead. Holes at the waterline were shot into the vessel, which capsized but did not sink. The wreck was subsequently recovered and repaired.
The boat was attacked by a Leigh Light equipped Vickers Wellington aircraft of No. 172 Squadron RAF on 13 July 1942. She was severely damaged and barely managed to reach Lorient, some 12 hours later.

Third patrol
Her third foray was to the South Atlantic and at 135 days, her longest and most destructive. Attacking and sinking among others, Boringia, the Empire Nomad and Ross. The boat was attacked by a SAAF [South African Air Force] Lockheed Ventura on 10 October 1942; only minor damage was sustained. She also torpedoed and sank La Salle on 7 November 1942. Her master was to be taken away as a prisoner, but he was returned to his men after he pointed out to the submariners that he was the only man who could navigate.

Another "Star", Star of Suez, was sunk. Amongst the floating debris were 45 aircraft tyres, a 20 hp electric motor and 120 grapefruits; they were recovered by U-159. Another U-boat, which had been thwarted in her attempt to get into an attacking position in time, also managed to rescue some aircraft tyres and spare parts for cars.

Fourth patrol
On her fourth patrol, U-159 sank Silverbeech on 28 March 1943 south of the Canary Islands from convoy RS 3. The U-boat was attacked by aircraft (she was one of eight), off the coast of Spanish, (now Western) Sahara.

Fifth patrol and loss

Her final patrol saw U-159 depart Lorient on 12 June 1943. She was sunk by a US Navy Mariner aircraft of VP-32.

Wolfpacks
U-159 took part in two wolfpacks, namely:
 Wohlgemut (12 – 22 March 1943) 
 Seeräuber (25 – 30 March 1943)

Summary of raiding history

References

Bibliography

External links

German Type IX submarines
U-boats commissioned in 1941
U-boats sunk in 1943
World War II submarines of Germany
World War II shipwrecks in the Atlantic Ocean
1941 ships
Ships built in Bremen (state)
U-boats sunk by US aircraft
U-boats sunk by depth charges
Ships lost with all hands
Maritime incidents in July 1943